NGC 3666 is an unbarred spiral galaxy in the constellation Leo. It was discovered by William Herschel on March 15, 1784. It is a member of the Leo II Groups, a series of galaxies and galaxy clusters strung out from the right edge of the Virgo Supercluster.

See also
 List of NGC objects (3001-4000)

Gallery

References

External links

Astronomical objects discovered in 1784
Unbarred spiral galaxies
3666
Leo (constellation)
035043